Pomorzowice  is a village located in Poland, in Opole Voivodeship, Głubczyce County and Gmina Głubczyce, near the border with the Czech Republic.

References

Villages in Głubczyce County